William Fisher Pearson (1854 – 3 July 1888) was a 19th-century Member of Parliament in New Zealand.

Pearson was educated at Christ's College, Christchurch. He worked for the Bank of New Zealand for several years. His work there impressed John Coster, who took him to England to help start the New Zealand Shipping Company.

He represented the Ashley electorate from 1881 to 1888, when he died. He had been planning to retire at the  but changed his mind due to pressure from his constituents.

References

1854 births
1888 deaths
People educated at Christ's College, Christchurch
Members of the New Zealand House of Representatives
New Zealand MPs for South Island electorates
19th-century New Zealand politicians